Canyon Creek is located in the Mogollon Rim area of the state of Arizona. The facilities are maintained by Tonto National Forest division of the USDA Forest Service.

Fish species
 Rainbow Trout
 Brown Trout

References

External links
 Arizona Fishing Locations Map
 Arizona Boating Locations Facilities Map
 HookedAZ.com Canyon Creek Information

Rivers of the Mogollon Rim
Rivers of Arizona
Rivers of Gila County, Arizona